Events from the year 1532 in Sweden

Incumbents
 Monarch – Gustav I

Events

 - Dissolution of the Varnhem Abbey.

Births

Deaths

References

 
Years of the 16th century in Sweden
Sweden